The 1988 Midland Group Championships was a women's tennis tournament played on indoor carpet court at the Brighton Centre in Brighton, England that was part of the 1988 WTA Tour. It was the 11th edition of the tournament and was held from 25 October until 30 October 1988. First-seeded Steffi Graf won the singles title, her second at the event after 1986, and earned $50,000 first-prize money as well as 300 Virginia Slims ranking points.

Finals

Singles

 Steffi Graf defeated  Manuela Maleeva 6–2, 6–0
 It was Graf's 11th singles title of the year and the 30th of her career.

Doubles

 Lori McNeil /  Betsy Nagelsen defeated  Isabelle Demongeot /  Nathalie Tauziat 7–6(7–5), 2–6, 7–6(7–3)

Prize money and ranking points

References

External links
 International Tennis Federation (ITF) tournament event details
 Tournament draws

Midland Group Tennis Championships
Brighton International
Midland Group Tennis Championships
Midland Group Tennis Championships